The Beijing–Chengde railway or Jingcheng railway, is a railroad in northern China between Beijing, the national capital, and Chengde in Hebei Province.

Route & history
The Jingcheng line from Dongbianmen to Huairou,  in length was built in 1938 during the Japanese occupation of Beiping.  The remaining  from Huairou to Shangbancheng was built from 1955 to 1959.  The line emerges north of the Great Wall at Chengzilu and then proceeds to Xinglong County and Yingshouyingzi before reaching Shangbancheng, where the line joins the Jinzhou–Chengde railway to Chengde.

The Beijing to Chengde section of the Beijing–Shenyang high-speed railway, opened in 2021, takes a similar but more direct and faster route between Beijing and Chengde.

Rail connections
 Beijing railway station: Beijing–Shanghai railway, Beijing–Harbin railway, Beijing–Baotou railway
 Beijing East railway station: Beijing–Harbin railway, Beijing–Baotou railway
 Gaogezhuang: Datong–Qinhuangdao railway
 Huairou: Beijing–Tongliao railway
 Shangbancheng: Jinzhou–Chengde railway
 Chengde: Chengde–Longhua railway

See also

 List of railways in China

References

Railway lines in China
Rail transport in Beijing
Rail transport in Hebei